Loris Guernieri (28 September 1937 – 1 March 2003) was an Italian racing cyclist. He rode in the 1963 Tour de France.

References

External links
 

1937 births
2003 deaths
Italian male cyclists
Place of birth missing
Cyclists from the Province of Mantua
Tour de Suisse stage winners